In 1998–99 Boca Juniors were the winners of both league championships in Argentine football.

Torneo Apertura ("Opening" Tournament)

Top Scorers

Relegation

There is no relegation after the Apertura. For the relegation results of this tournament see below

Torneo Clausura ("Closing" Tournament)

Top Scorers

Relegation

Relegation table

Argentine clubs in international competitions

National team
This section covers Argentina's matches from August 1, 1998, to July 31, 1999.

Friendly matches

1999 Copa América

References

External links
AFA
Argentina on FIFA.com
Argentina 1998–1999 by Javier Romiser at rsssf.

 

es:Torneo Clausura 1999 (Argentina)
it:Campionato di calcio argentino 1998-1999
pl:I liga argentyńska w piłce nożnej (1998/1999)